Viva was an adult woman's magazine that premiered in 1973 and ceased publication in 1980.  Its full title was Viva, The International Magazine For Women, and it was published by Bob Guccione and his wife, Kathy Keeton. The first issue of Viva is dated October 1973.  Guccione was the editor of Penthouse, an adult men's magazine, and he wanted to publish a companion title for women. Viva was essentially an erotic magazine for women, containing articles and fiction delving into women’s fantasies, and exploring their sexuality, reviews of the arts, interviews with known personalities, fashion and beauty, etc. It was published on a monthly basis.

Anna Wintour's first position as a fashion editor was at Viva in 1976.

References

Works cited
 Oppenheimer, Jerry (2005). Front Row: The Cool Life and Hot Times of Vogue's Editor In Chief. St. Martin's Press, New York. .

External links
Article in Washington Monthly mentioning Viva Magazine
Viva Viva? Article from Time 1973.
Skin Magazines for Women, Associated Press. Jacki King, November 5, 1973, The Free Lance Star, Fredericksburg, Virginia.

Defunct women's magazines published in the United States
Erotica magazines published in the United States
Magazines established in 1973
Magazines disestablished in 1980
Magazines published in New York City
Monthly magazines published in the United States
Photography magazines